Rise is the second studio album by American supergroup Hollywood Vampires, consisting of Alice Cooper, Johnny Depp and Joe Perry. It was released on June 21, 2019, on EarMusic.

Recording
The album consists of 13 tracks of original material, plus covers of David Bowie's ""Heroes"", Johnny Thunders' "You Can't Put Your Arms Around a Memory", and The Jim Carroll Band's "People Who Died".

English guitarist Jeff Beck features on the song "Welcome to Bushwackers".

Critical reception
At Metacritic, which assigns a weighted average rating out of 100 to reviews from mainstream publications, this release received an average score of 57, based on 7 reviews, indicating "mixed or average reviews".

Track listing

Charts

See also
 List of UK Rock & Metal Albums Chart number ones of 2019

References

2019 albums
Hollywood Vampires (band) albums